Dee Robson (Dee Kelly) is a former costume designer for the BBC (British Broadcasting Corporation). Mrs. Robson was born in Liverpool, studied art at the Southport School of Fine Arts, Lancashire, and design for the theatre at the Wimbledon College of Art. She is now based in London. The inspiration for her monster and costume designs comes from many sources, such as Russian ballet and Memento mori statues. Mrs. Robson worked for a time under the fashion designer Mary Quant and her style continues to reflect the clarity and directness of fashion drawing. No compilation of her works exist due to copyright issues, but she owns a vast portfolio. She has worked for some of Britain's leading theatres:

The London Ballet company (run by Walter Gore and Paula Hinton).
The Oxford Playhouse
Prospect Productions
Liverpool Playhouse
Pitlochry Festival Theatre
Century Theatre, Keswick, Cumbria
Century Theatre, Carlisle
Yvonne Arnaud Theatre
Welsh Theatre company
Atheneum Theatre, Plymouth
The Delfont Organization

List of TV work
Moonbase 3 (1973)
The Goodies:
"The Goodies Rule – O.K.?" (1975)
Blake's 7:
"Powerplay" (1980)
"Aftermath" (1980)
The Hitchhiker's Guide to the Galaxy (1981)
Blackadder:
unaired pilot (1982)
Doctor Who:
"Arc of Infinity" (1983)
"Terminus" (1983)
No Place Like Home
Grange Hill
EastEnders

External links

English costume designers
Living people
Year of birth missing (living people)
Theatre people from Merseyside